The First Battle of Tucson was a confrontation at Tucson, Arizona on December 6, 1779, as part of the Apache-Mexico Wars. Captain Pedro Allande y Saabedra with a force of only fifteen men defeated an army of around 350 strong.

Battle
Not much is known about the first battle at Tucson. An Apache force, which Captain Allande estimated as 350 warriors, approached the Spanish post of Fort Tucson itself. The captain formed a command of fifteen men and engaged the enemy. The Spanish lancers defeated the Apaches in a long running battle. Allande cut off and brought back the head of a slain chieftain and carried it on a lance as a trophy. After waving the head at the surviving Apaches they fled the battlefield, abandoning their plunder of stolen livestock. The Spaniards reportedly killed and wounded several Apache men, including a brother of Chief Quilcho. Exact numbers of casualties are unknown.

See also
 Siege of Tubac
 American Indian Wars
 Apache Wars
 Navaho Wars
 History of Tucson, Arizona

References

 Bancroft, Hubert Howe, 1888, History of Arizona and New Mexico, 1530–1888. The History Company, San Francisco.
 Cooper, Evelyn S., 1995, Tucson in Focus: The Buehman Studio. Arizona Historical Society, Tucson..
 Dobyns, Henry F., 1976, Spanish Colonial Tucson. University of Arizona Press, Tucson..
 Drachman, Roy P., 1999, From Cowtown to Desert Metropolis: Ninety Years of Arizona Memories. Whitewing Press, San Francisco. (.

Conflicts in 1779
1779 in the United States
Tucson
Tucson
Apache–Mexico Wars
1779 in New Spain
Tucson 1